Mandan is a ghost town in Grant Township, Keweenaw County, Michigan, on US Highway 41, about twelve miles south of Copper Harbor. It was the site of the Mandan Mine and the Medora Mine, two copper mines which were organized in 1864 and worked intermittently until their abandonment in 1909. The town was served by the Keweenaw Central Railroad.

References

 Monette, Clarence J. All About Mandan, Michigan. Lake Linden, MI: C.J. Monette, 1982.  In the collection of the Clarke Historical Library, Central Michigan University.
 Michigan Geological and Biological Survey, 1911.
 Mandan Mining Location, "Exploring the North", retrieved 2008-10-20.  
 

Unincorporated communities in Keweenaw County, Michigan
Unincorporated communities in Michigan
Mining communities in Michigan
Populated places established in 1905
1905 establishments in Michigan